Mummidivaram mandal is one of the 22 mandals in Konaseema district of Andhra Pradesh. As per census 2011, there are 11 villages in this mandal.

Demographics 
Mummidivaram mandal has total population of 68,586 as per the 2011 Census out of which 34,389 are males while 34,197 are females. The average sex ratio is 994. The total literacy rate is 78%.

Towns and villages

Villages 
1. Balusulanka
2. Ainapuram
3. Ananthavaram
4. Annampalle
5. Ch. Gunnepalle
6. Gadilanka
7. Kamini
8. Komanapalle
9. Kothalanka
10. Krapa Chintalapudi
11. Mummidivaram
12. Tanelanka

See also 
List of mandals in Andhra Pradesh

References 

Mandals in Konaseema district
Mandals in Andhra Pradesh